The Delicate Prey and Other Stories is a collection of 17 works of short fiction by Paul Bowles, published in 1950 by Random House.

Typical of Bowles's oeuvre, the majority of the stories in this volume are set in Latin American and North Africa. Only two are set in the United States.

Bowles, at the time of its publication, was known primarily for his work as an American modernist composer. The Delicate Prey and Other Stories established him as a notable literary talent.
The stories published in this collection include a number of chef-d'oeuvres, including "A Distant Episode", "Pages from Cold Point" and "The Delicate Prey".

Stories 
 at paso rojo
 pastor dowe at tacaté
 call at corazon
 under the sky
 señor ong and señor ha
 the circular valley
 the echo
 the scorpion
 the fourth day out from santa cruz
 pages from cold point
 you are not i
 how many midnights
 a thousand days to mokhatar
 tea on the mountain
 by the water
 delicate prey
 a distant episode

Theme and style

 One of the unifying features of the stories in this collection are their settings: many of them occur in regions foreign to most Americans, including North Africa and Latin America. From these settings arise Bowles's "thematic concerns." Author Gore Vidal notes that "Landscape is all-important in a Bowles story" and Bowles himself remarked: "It seems a practical procedure to let the place determine the characters who will inhabit it." The characters are impelled towards alien and strange territory, both physically and psychologically, challenging their Western cultural assumptions.

Bowles's "unmistakably modern" thematic concerns" are demonstrated by his "depiction of violence and terror."
The violent episodes that appear in the stories of this collection have been widely remarked upon, as well as the style in which they are rendered.
Literary critic Allen Hibbard, though recognizing the "thorougly pessimistic" themes, traces Bowles's literary style to that of 19th Century authors, such as  Flaubert,  Turgenev and   James:

Bowles, commenting on his own style: "I don't try to analyze the emotions of any of my characters. I don't give them emotions. You can explain a thought but not an emotion. You can't use emotions. There's nothing you can do with them."

Literary critic Francine Prose observes:

Footnotes

Sources 
 Hibbard, Allen. 1993. Paul Bowles: A Study of the Short Fiction. Twayne Publishers. New York. 
  Prose, Francine. 2002. The Coldest Eye: acting badly among the Arabs. Harper's Magazine. March 2002. https://harpers.org/archive/2002/03/the-coldest-eye/  Retrieved July 10, 2022.
   Tóibín, Colm. 2007. Avoid the Orient. Review, of Paul Bowles: A Life, by Virginia Spencer Carr. London Review of Books,  Vol. 29 No. 1, January 4, 2007. https://www.lrb.co.uk/the-paper/v29/n01/colm-toibin/avoid-the-orient Retrieved July 11, 2022.
 Vidal, Gore. 1979. Introduction to Paul Bowles; Collected Stories, 1939-1976. Black Sparrow Press. Santa Rosa. 2001. 

1950 short story collections
Short story collections by Paul Bowles
Random House books